Drillia katiae is a species of sea snail, a marine gastropod mollusc in the family Drilliidae.

Description

Distribution
This species occurs in the Atlantic Ocean off Gabon.

References

Endemic fauna of Gabon
katiae
Gastropods described in 2006